Hygrophorus chrysodon is a species of fungus in the genus Hygrophorus. It is edible but bland in taste. The species is found throughout the Northern Hemisphere.

The name chrysodon is Greek for 'golden tooth', a reference to the species' gold-hued granules or hairs, which are found on the cap (especially near the edge), stipe, and gills. The fruit bodies are white, sometimes with a tinge of yellow.

References

chrysodon
Edible fungi
Fungi of Europe
Fungi described in 1789
Taxa named by August Batsch